Silvano  is a surname. Notable people with the surname include:

 Judi Silvano (born 1951), American jazz singer and composer
 José Silvano Ángelo (born 1980), Spanish footballer

See also 

 Silvano (disambiguation)
 Silvano (name)
 Silvani